The High Commissioner of the United Kingdom to The Gambia is the United Kingdom's foremost diplomatic representative in the Republic of The Gambia.

Until 2013 The Gambia was a member of the Commonwealth and the United Kingdom's representative was a High Commissioner. On 2 October 2013 the Gambian government announced that the country was to withdraw from the Commonwealth. On 20 November 2013 the British High Commission formally became the British Embassy and the British High Commissioner became the British Ambassador. 

Fulfilling an election pledge of President Adama Barrow, The Gambia rejoined the Commonwealth on 8 February 2018 and the British Ambassador became the British High Commissioner again.

List of heads of mission

High Commissioners

1965–1967: George Crombie
1968–1971: Granville Ramage
1972–1975: James Roland Walter Parker
1975–1979: Martin Rogers
1979–1981: Eric Smith
1981–1984: David Francis Battye Le Breton
1984–1987: John Garner
1988–1990: Alec Ibbott
1991–1993: Alan Pover
1994–1995: Michael Hardie
1995–1998: John Wilde
1998–2000: Tony Millson
2000–2002: John Perrott
2002–2006: Eric Jenkinson
2006–2011: Philip Sinkinson
2011–2013: David Morley

Ambassadors

2013–2014: David Morley
2014–2017: Colin Crorkin
2017–2018: Sharon Wardle

High Commissioners

2018–: Sharon Wardle

2020–: David Belgrove OBE

References

External links

UK and Gambia, gov.uk

Gambia
Gambia
 
The Gambia and the Commonwealth of Nations
United Kingdom and the Commonwealth of Nations
United Kingdom